Kūpapa (also called Queenites, from Queen Victoria, loyalists and the friendly natives) were Māori who fought on the British side in the New Zealand Wars of the 19th century.

The motives of the kūpapa varied greatly, as did their degree of commitment to the British cause. Historian James Belich identified three categories of groups within their ranks.

At one end of the scale were kūpapa groups who had whole-hearted support for the British. These included the largest tribe in New Zealand Ngāpuhi, (estimated by demographer Ian Pool to have 40% of all Maori people in 1840) who held a meeting under their chief Tāmati Wāka Nene, in the Hokianga in 1863 to back the government in the war against the Waikato "rebels". Waka Nene, who was a close supporter of governor Grey, offered the services of Ngāpuhi warriors, which Grey declined. It also included the bulk of the Arawa, from Rotorua and Bay of Plenty, who had become estranged from their Māori neighbours and sought an alliance with the government to survive in isolation. Others who were deeply committed were bands of warriors affiliated with chiefs such as Ropata Wahawaha of Ngāti Porou and Te Keepa Te Rangihiwinui of Wanganui whose power in the tribe had grown because of their kūpapa activities.

A second category included groups who supported the British cause for a limited reason of their own—either to protect their economic activities with British settlers or to gain an advantage over local rivals. Belich suggests kūpapa involvement in the Battle of Moutoa on May 14, 1864, thwarting a Pai Mārire raid on Wanganui, was motivated by their desire to protect their valuable commercial dealings at the settlement.

A third category of kūpapa gave superficial support to the British, accompanying colonial expeditions but declining to do much fighting. Some in this category joined simply for the pay—Wanganui warriors who joined the British to battle Titokowaru during hostilities in 1868-9 received four shillings a day.

Belich claims the British rarely recognised the differing levels of commitment and frequently accused kūpapa of treachery, cowardice, lethargy and incompetence. But he says the kūpapa were often good soldiers, particularly when given government support that allowed them to muster large forces and maintain them longer than their Māori foe. He concluded: "Despite their qualified commitment, kūpapa were vital to the colonists after the withdrawal of Imperial troops. Without them, the colonial operations of 1864-8 would have been far less successful, and the wars against Titokowaru and Te Kooti might have been lost."

Historian Michael King said kūpapa Māori mostly prospered in the wake of the land wars. He said their lands and resources were intact,  they received favourable government attention, including ceremonial swords and monuments for their dead, and were also consulted on some matters of public policy.

The term has also had an occasional modern usage in a derogatory sense to describe a Māori who is seen as being on the Pākehā or government side and acting against the interests of Māori in conflict with government authorities.

References

Māori words and phrases
New Zealand Wars